Nuevo Progreso, Tamaulipas also known as El Progreso is a community located in Nuevo Laredo Municipality in the Mexican state of Tamaulipas.  According to the INEGI Census of 2010, El Progreso has a population of 432 inhabitants. Its elevation is 150 meters above sea level.

References 

Populated places in Tamaulipas
Laredo–Nuevo Laredo